Muslihudin Čekrekčija Mosque, also known as Čaršijska, is second oldest domed mosque in Sarajevo. It was constructed in 1526 in the Baščaršija area of the city, at the foot of Kovač (the center of the city's old trading center). It is raised in the mahala of Isa-Bey's turn. This is also the oldest known original document written in Sarajevo.

"When a man dies, his work comes to an end, except for three things: the knowledge and skills he used, the good child who prays for him, and his enduring sadaqa [good deeds]."

– translation by Mehmed Handžić

Since 2004, the mosque has been under the protection of the Commission to Preserve National Monuments of Bosnia and Herzegovina. The decision was made by the Commission for the Preservation of National Monuments at the session held from 2 to 8 November 2004 with the following members: Zeynep Ahunbay, Amra Hadžimuhamedović (chair), Dubravko Lovrenović, Ljiljana Ševo and Tina Wik, who declared the mosque the National Monument of Bosnia and Herzegovina. Today its links to its commercial past remain, as it is surrounded by shops.

See also
 Islam in Bosnia and Herzegovina
 List of mosques in Bosnia and Herzegovina

Literature 
 Mehmed Mujezinović, Islamic Epigraphic of Bosnia and Herzegovina, Book I – Sarajevo, Sarajevo, 1988.

 Behija Zlatar, Zlatni period Sarajeva: Contributions to the history of Sarajevo, Institute of History, 1997

 Alija Bejtić, Streets and squares of old Sarajevo, Sarajevo 1973.

 Andrej Andrejevic, Islamic monumental art of the 16th century in Yugoslavia – dome mosque, Faculty of Philosophy in Belgrade, Institute for the History of Art, Belgrade, 1984

References 

Mosques in Sarajevo
Religious buildings and structures completed in 1526
Centar, Sarajevo
Attacks on religious buildings and structures during the Bosnian War
Ottoman mosques in Bosnia and Herzegovina
16th-century mosques
1526 establishments in the Ottoman Empire
Medieval Bosnia and Herzegovina architecture
Baščaršija